Marx's Theory of Ideology is a 1982 book about Karl Marx by the political theorist Bhikhu Parekh. The work was inspired by Parekh's experience of racial discrimination in British society.

Reception
Marx's Theory of Ideology was reviewed by Nicholas Abercrombih in Sociology. The political theorist Terrell Carver called the book a classic exposition of the Marxist theory of ideology.

References

Bibliography
Books

 

Journals

  

Online articles

 

1982 non-fiction books
Books about Karl Marx
Books by Bhikhu Parekh
Contemporary philosophical literature
English-language books
Johns Hopkins University Press books
Marxist books